Elections were held in the Australian state of Western Australia on 30 April 1960 to elect 10 of the 30 members of the state's Legislative Council.

Results

Legislative Council

|}

Retiring Members

Country

 Charles Latham (Central)
 Hugh Roche (South)

Candidates

Election results

Central

Metropolitan

Midland

North

North-East

 Preferences were not distributed.

South

South-East

 Preferences were not distributed.

South-West

Suburban

West

See also

 Members of the Western Australian Legislative Council, 1960–1962

References

1960 elections in Australia
Elections in Western Australia
April 1960 events in Australia